Caba, officially the Municipality of Caba, is a 4th class municipality in the province of La Union, Philippines. According to the 2020 census, it has a population of 23,119 people.

Caba was a part of the municipality of Aringay until the late-19th century when it was permanently separated to form its own entity.

History

History records show that this municipality used three names interchangeably: Caba, Cava, and Caua. According to a local historian Pedro Manongdo, two tales have persisted on how the town got his name.  One group referred to an incident when a Spaniard asked an inhabitant the name of the place.  The youth mistook the question as an inquiry to the name of the animal he was herding and answered “Cava.”  The repetition of the name ended with Cava and later Caba.

Another story sustained that Caba was the name given by a group of immigrants from barrio Caba, San Carlos, Pangasinan who settled in the community in the later years of the 16th century. In memory of the place where they came from, they named the new settlement CABA.

Caba was founded as a settlement in 1598 by Augustinian Fathers with Don Agustin dela Cruz as the “first man to rule.”  The settlement developed into barangay in 1692 with don Luis Manongdo as the Cabeza de barangay. It became a town in 1783 with Don Domingo Aragon as gobernadorcillo.

Two other historians however have claimed different dates on the founding of Caba as a town.  On one hand, Father Jose Braganza, SVD claims that Caba was founded in 1745 along with Aringay.  On the other hand, Julian Martin claims that Caba was founded in 1844.

In 1903, the Philippine commission reorganized the administrative and territorial set-up of municipalities in the country.  Due to a meager population of financial difficulties, some smaller municipalities were integrated.  Caba was integrated with Aringay while Santo Tomas to Agoo.

In 1907, Executive Order no. 41 was issued which provided that Caba be separated from Aringay.  The order took effect on January 1, 1908, thus Caba again became a regular municipality with Francisco Sobredillo as Chief Executive.

Caba is the birthplace of Diego Silang, the inspiration and the leader of the Ilocos Revolt of 1762-1763. During the Spanish period, Silang established an independent rebel government in Northern Luzon and agitated for reforms in and out of the government. However, Spanish authorities resorted to assassinating him with the help of one of his followers who betrayed him with a shot in his back on May 28, 1763.  The assassin's bullet did not however smother the flame of Silang rebellion.  His wife Gabriella took the torch of leadership and by her own right, continued the rebellion heroically.  Four months later, she was captured by Spanish forces and was executed publicly in Vigan on September 20, 1763, thus ended not only the heroic adventure of the “Ilocandia’s Joan of Arc” but also Silang's revolt. A predominantly Roman Catholic municipality. In 1997 the Roman Catholic Church Celebrated its 400 years of Christianity basing on church's documents

Geography

Barangays
Caba is politically subdivided into barangays. These barangays are headed by elected officials: Barangay Captain, Barangay Council, whose members are called Barangay Councilors. All are elected every three years.

Climate

Demographics

Religion

 Assemblies of God (Poblacion Norte)
 Assemblies of God (San Jose)
 Assemblies of the First Born (Gana)
 Assemblies of the First Born (Juan Cartas)
 Assemblies of the First Born (Liquicia)
 Assemblies of the First Born (San Cornelio)
 Assemblies of the First Born (San Jose)
 Assemblies of the First Born (Sobredillo)
 Assemblies of the First Born (Urayong)
 Christ Centered Fellowship (Juan Cartas)
 Faith Gospel Mission Church/Yes for Jesus Crusaders International (Poblacion Norte)
 Iglesia Filipina Independiente (Poblacion Norte)
 Iglesia Ni Cristo (Gana)
 Jesus Christ The Glorious Savior International Ministry JCGSIM LU [Full Gospel Christian Church] (Poblacion Norte)
 Messengers of the Cross Bible College/Assemblies of the First Born Full Gospel Church (Poblacion Norte)
 Shinil Caba Christian Fellowship (Poblacion Norte)
 The Lord's Vineyard Baptist Church (Las-ud)
 United Church of Christ in the Philippines (Poblacion Norte)
 Words of Life Christian Ministries (Santiago Norte)

Economy

Government
Just as the national government, the municipal government of Caba, is divided into three branches: executive, legislative, and judiciary. The judicial branch is administered solely by the Supreme Court of the Philippines. The LGUs have control of the executive and legislative branches.

The executive branch is composed of the mayor and the barangay captain for the barangays.Local Government Code of the Philippines, Book III, Department of the Interior and Local Government official website.

The legislative branch is composed of the Sangguniang Bayan (town assembly), Sangguniang Barangay (barangay council), and the Sangguniang Kabataan for the youth sector.

The seat of Government is vested upon the Mayor and other elected officers who hold office at the Caba Town Hall. The Sanguniang Bayan is the center of legislation, stationed in Caba Legislative Building.

Elected officials

Tourism

 Sangria is a privately-owned Farm Resort located in Barangay Gana. 
 Diego Silang's monument is erected in the middle of the Town Plaza.
 President Elpidio Quirino's stone monument on the other hand was placed at Barangay Gana highway.  Quirino taught in Caba as an elementary public school teacher.
 Ripe and green mangoes, Bagoong, Padas, and Alamang are the town's products that are sold install along the Gana roads.
 Bamboo furniture is one of the prime business of the residents.
 Mt. Kimmallugong is the town's hiking and camping site.
 Sobredillo barrio: one can find the 56 Mortar (weapon) (bombs, 81 millimeter each of Japanese soldiers, World War II), were unearthed near Mayor Clyde Crispino's house in Barangay Sobredillo including a 1-high old jar, for serving offerings in religious rites.
Caba holds the records in the "Search for Cleanest and Greenest Municipality in La Union" (4th-5th Class Municipality Category in 2006, 2007 and 2008). It also claimed the Regional Level and National Finalist trophies, for Seal of Good Housekeeping trophies in 2010, including the 2010 Provincial Championship medal in the Search for Best Performing LGU Local Governance Performance Measurement System).
Caba celebrates on April 15 to 18, the town fiesta and on June 24, the Feast of Saint John the Baptist.

Caba holds its Paskua Ti Umili every December.

Caba beach

Caba prime beaches are located along Lingayen Gulf in La Union.

 Caba's prime tourist spot is Villa Navarro Beach Resort and Restaurant (along Lingayen Gulf in Caba, 247 kilometers north of Manila and 10 km north of Agoo, La Union).
 Sea of Dreams Spa Resort (San Carlos).
 Paiko Blue Waters Beach Resort and Spa is another Caba's

 Maglaya Medical-Legal Missions Inc We Care Clinic (MMLM)
 Caba Medicare Community Hospital
 Caba Municipal Health Center

Education

Elementary schools
 Caba Central Elementary School
 Dona Antonia Elementary School
 Jesus Cares Christian Academy (formerly Faith Mission Academy, Incorporated)
 Labbon Elementary School
 Liquicia Elementary School
 San Carlos Elementary School
 San Cornelio Elementary School
 San Gregorio Elementary School
 San Jose Elementary School
 Santiago Sur Integrated School
 St. John the Baptist Learning Center
 Wenceslao Elementary School

Secondary schools
 Caba National High School
 International World Mission School (formerly Remnant Int'l School)
 La Union Standard Academy
 Saint John the Baptist Learning Center
 San Gregorio National High School
 San Jose National High School
 Wenceslao National High School

Colleges
 Messengers of the Cross Bible College

Gallery

References

External links

 Caba Website
 Local Government of Caba
 [ Philippine Standard Geographic Code]
 Philippine Census Information
 Local Governance Performance Management System

Municipalities of La Union